Deniz Ayçiçek (born 5 June 1990) is a German footballer, who plays for TSV Kolenfeld.

References

External links
 

1990 births
Living people
People from Neustadt am Rübenberge
German people of Turkish descent
Footballers from Lower Saxony
German footballers
Association football midfielders
Hannover 96 II players
MSV Duisburg players
3. Liga players